Dobera is a genus of flowering plants belonging to the family Salvadoraceae.

Its native range is Eritrea to Mozambique, Arabian Peninsula, Western India.

Species:

Dobera glabra 
Dobera loranthifolia

References

Salvadoraceae
Brassicales genera